The 13th Golden Raspberry Awards were held on March 28, 1993, at the Hollywood Roosevelt Hotel to recognize the worst the movie industry had to offer in 1992. Shining Through and Stop! Or My Mom Will Shoot each won three Razzies, though the latter wasn't nominated for Worst Picture. Tom Selleck did not attend the ceremony and later accepted his award on The Chevy Chase Show.

Alan Menken, who wrote the music for the Razzie-winning song "High Times, Hard Times" from Newsies, also received the Academy Award for Best Original Song for "A Whole New World" from Aladdin in 1993, making him the first person to receive a Razzie and Oscar in the same year, a feat not repeated until screenwriter Brian Helgeland in 1998.

Awards and nominations

Films with multiple nominations 
These films received multiple nominations:

Criticism 
The awards was criticized for the nomination to Danny DeVito's well-received performance for Worst Supporting Actor in Batman Returns.

See also

1992 in film
65th Academy Awards
46th British Academy Film Awards
50th Golden Globe Awards

References

External links
‘Bodyguard’ tops Razzie noms at Variety
Razzie Awards 1993  at IMDb

Golden Raspberry Awards
Golden Raspberry Awards ceremonies
Golden Raspberry
Golden Raspberry Awards
Golden Raspberry Awards
Golden Raspberry